Babu Nagwa is a village located in the Gorakhpur district of Uttar Pradesh, India. Arjun Singh Srinet Born here.

Villages in Gorakhpur district